Tu Nedhe was a territorial electoral district for the Legislative Assembly of the Northwest Territories, Canada. The district consists of Fort Resolution and Lutselk'e.

The riding was dissolved for the 2015 election, merging with the district of Weledeh to create the new district of Tu Nedhé-Wiilideh.

Members of the Legislative Assembly (MLAs)

Election results

2015 election 

**Beaulieu was previously member for the abolished district of Weledeh

2011 election

2007 election

2003 election

1999 election

Notes

References

External links 
Website of the Legislative Assembly of Northwest Territories

Former electoral districts of Northwest Territories